The World Group II was the second-highest level of Fed Cup competition in 2007. Winning nations advanced to the World Group Play-offs, and the losing nations were demoted to the World Group II Play-offs.

Slovakia vs. Czech Republic

Germany vs. Croatia

Canada vs. Israel

Austria vs. Australia

References

See also
Fed Cup structure

World II